NCED may refer to:

 National Center for Earth-surface Dynamics
 9-cis-epoxycarotenoid dioxygenase, an enzyme
 National Center for Employee Development, a personnel training center owned USPS, and operated by Aramark. NCED is a closed to the public campus located in Norman, Oklahoma